Ralph Dellor (1948 – 1 September 2017) was an English sports writer, journalist and TV and radio commentator, primarily on cricket. He was also a cricket coach.

He began his career in 1970 with BBC local radio, and went on to work for Grandstand and Match of the Day on BBC television, as well as for Test Match Special on BBC radio. In 2000 he won the Jack Fingleton Award as cricket commentator of the year.

He was an ECB-accredited cricket coach, and coached the Norwegian national side that won the European Trophy in 2003, 2005 and 2006.

He wrote a number of books, mostly on cricket, and from 1984 to 1988 he was editor of the Cricketers' Who's Who. He was the ICC's first media consultant. He was director of cricket operations at Cricinfo from 2000 to 2003, and commentated for them on the 2000 Women's World Cup in New Zealand. He left together with Stephen Lamb to set up his own business, Sportsline Media. He was an after-dinner speaker, and also became the "Voice of Lord's" as MCC's public address announcer.

He was described as "widely liked and respected within cricket".  As well as cricket, he also played golf. He was diagnosed with prostate cancer in mid  July 2017. He died of sepsis in the early hours of 1 September 2017, just 10 days after his first course of chemotherapy and at the age of 69.

References

Bibliography
 British Golf Courses: A guide to courses & clubs in the British Isles, coathor with Marion Willis and editor, 1974, 
 A Hundred Years Of The Ashes, coauthored by Doug Ibbotson and edited by David Firth, Rothmans Publications, 1982, 
 Funny Turn: Confessions of a Cricketing Clown, autobiography of Ray East edited by Dellor, Allen & Unwin, 1984, 
 Cricketers' Who's Who 1987, co-editor with Iain Sproat, Collins, 1987, 
 Copy Book Cricket, coauthor with Les Lenham, Robson Books Ltd, 1989, 
 How to Coach Cricket, HarperCollins Willow, 1990, 
 Durham: Birth of a First-class County, Bloomsbury Publishing PLC, 1992, 
 Winning the Ashes: The Summer a Nation Held Its Breath (Lords Taverners), The History Press, 2005, 
 History of Cricket, coauthor with Stephen Lamb, Sutton Publishing Ltd, 2006, 
 Little Book of Cricket Legends, coauthor with Stephen Lamb, Green Umbrella Publishing, 2006, 
 Cricket Legends Gift Pack (Gift Packs (Book and DVD)), coauthor with Stephen Lamb, Green Umbrella Publishing, 2007, 
 The A-Z of Cricket: A Cricketing A to Z, coauthor with Stephen Lamb, Green Umbrella Publishing, 2009, 
 Little Book of the Ashes, coauthor with Stephen Lamb, Green Umbrella Publishing, 2009, 
 Cricket: Steps to Success, Human Kinetics Europe Ltd, 2010, 
 Lost Voices of Cricket, coauthor with Stephen Lamb, Bene Factum Publishing Ltd, 2014, 

1948 births
2017 deaths
British sportswriters
British sports broadcasters
English cricket commentators
Cricket historians and writers
English cricket coaches